LZ 72 (navy designation L 31) was an R Class super-zeppelin belonging to the Imperial German Navy. It was commanded by Kapitänleutnant Heinrich Mathy, an experienced commander, and took part in several raids over London during World War I. It also participated in a reconnaissance role during the Sunderland raid of 19 August 1916.  Its last flight was launched late at night on 1 October 1916. Several miles north of London, it was caught in searchlights and anti-aircraft fire. During this engagement, 2nd Lt. Wulstan J. Tempest was on patrol and spotted the zeppelin. He proceeded to engage the airship with incendiary rounds, causing the ship to burst into flames and crash in a field near Potter's Bar. The entire crew died, and were originally buried there but were transported to Cannock Chase in the 1960s. After this disastrous crash, the Imperial German Navy began reducing the number of zeppelin raids.

Operators

Imperial German Navy

Oakmere Park 
In September 2019 it was announced that Hertsmere Borough Council agreed planning permission for a Super Zeppelin Tower in the junior play area within Oakmere Park.

Specifications (LZ 72 / Type R zeppelin)

See also

List of Zeppelins

References

Further reading

 

Zeppelins
Airships of the Imperial German Navy
1916 in military history
Military airships of World War I
Individual aircraft
Aircraft first flown in 1916